Daniel Greenstein has played a number of roles in US and UK higher education. He was director of the "postsecondary success strategy" program at the Bill & Melinda Gates Foundation. In 2018, he was named the fifth chancellor of Pennsylvania's State System of Higher Education. He is also a board member of Ridge-Lane Limited Partners a venture capital firm.

Career

While directing the Gates Foundation's Postsecondary Success division, he worked with other higher education leaders nationwide on initiatives intended to boost educational-attainment, in particular among low-income and minority students. Before joining the Gates Foundation, he was Vice Provost for Academic Planning, Programs, and Coordination at the University of California's Office of the President, where he was responsible for a range of information, publishing, and broadcast services (the California Digital Library, the University of California Press, and UCTV), off-campus instructional programs (e.g. Education Abroad) as well as academic planning and accountability. With Christopher Edley, he led an initiative to evaluate the effectiveness of online instruction in UC's undergraduate curriculum and, more generally, as a strategy for expanding access to high-quality university education.

Greenstein has served as Director of the California Digital Library (2002-7), of the Digital Library Federation (1999-2002) and was founding director of the Arts and Humanities Data Service and co-director of the Resource Discovery Network, both in the  UK. He holds degrees from the University of Oxford (DPhil), where he was a member of Corpus Christi College, and Pennsylvania (MA, BA) and began his career as a member of the history faculty at the University of Glasgow.

During his time as the Chancellor of the Pennsylvania State System of Higher Education he was instrumental in the Consolidation of six of the Universities into two.

Selected Published works
 __. (2010). "Strategies for Sustaining the University Library." 'portal: Libraries and the academy. 10:2. 
 __. (2004). "Not So Quiet on a Western Front." Nature. Web Focus: Access to the Literature.
 Greenstein, Daniel and Suzanne E. Thorin. (2002). The Digital Library: A Biography. Washington, D.C.: Digital Library Federation, Council on Library and Information Resources.
 __. (2000). "Digital Libraries and Their Challenges." Library Trends. 49:2.
 __ and N. Beagrie. (1998) A Strategic Framework for Creating and Preserving Digital Collections. London:  The British Library.
__. (1994). A Historian's Guide to Computing. Oxford Guides to Computing for the Humanities. Oxford: Oxford University Press.
__. (1994). "The Junior Members, 1900-1990: A Profile." In The History of the University of Oxford. Volume VIII: The Twentieth Century. Brian Harrison, ed. Oxford: Oxford University Press.
 __. (1991). Modelling Historical Data: Towards a Standard for Encoding and Exchanging Machine-Readable Texts. (Halbgraue Reihe zur historischen Fachinformatik / A 11) St. Katharinen: Scripta Mercaturae  .

Sources/links
 Keller, Josh, and Mark Parry. "U of California Considers Online Classes, or Even Degrees." Chronicle of Higher Education. October 23, 2010.
 "The Library as Search Engine." Chronicle of Higher Education. January 5, 2007.
 Burdman, Pamela. "A Quiet Revolt Puts Costly Journals on Web", The New York Times, June 26, 2004.
 Hafner, Katie. "Old Search Engine, the Library, Tries to Fit Into a Google World", The New York Times, June 21, 2004.
 __.  "In Challenge to Google, Yahoo Will Scan Books" New York Times. October 3, 2005.
 Markoff, John and Edward Wyatt.  "Google Is Adding Major Libraries to Its Database" New York Times. December 14, 2004.
 Riding, Alan.  "France Detects a Cultural Threat in Google" New York Times. April 11, 2005.
 Terdiman, Daniel. "A Tool for Scholars Who Like to Dig Deep" New York Times.'' November 25, 2004.

References 

University of California faculty
American Jews
American librarians
Living people
University of Pennsylvania alumni
Year of birth missing (living people)
Alumni of Corpus Christi College, Oxford